The antenna codlet, Bregmaceros atlanticus, is a species of codlet found in the subtropical zones of the oceans.

References

Bregmacerotidae
Fish described in 1886
Fish of the Atlantic Ocean